Farida Abiyeva ( March 20, 1995 , Baku, Azerbaijan) is an Azerbaijani karateka. Farida Abiyeva won a gold medal at the 2017 Islamic Solidarity Games held in Baku, Azerbaijan.

In 2021, she competed at the World Olympic Qualification Tournament held in Paris, France hoping to qualify for the 2020 Summer Olympics in Tokyo, Japan.

References

1995 births
Living people
Azerbaijani female karateka
European Games competitors for Azerbaijan
Karateka at the 2015 European Games
Islamic Solidarity Games medalists in karate
Islamic Solidarity Games competitors for Azerbaijan
20th-century Azerbaijani women
21st-century Azerbaijani women

Baku State University (Philology) 2013-2017

Senior lieutenant of the SBS 

Baku State University (Law) 2020